Katherine Rhymes Speed Ettl (April 7, 1911 - January 10, 1993) was an American sculptor. She designed many bronze statues, including the one of President Andrew Jackson outside the Jackson City Hall.

Life
Ettl was born on April 7, 1911, in Monticello, Mississippi, the daughter of C. Douglas Rhymes.

Ettl designed many bronze statues, including the one of President Andrew Jackson outside the Jackson City Hall. She also designed statues of the Kansas City Chiefs for the Arrowhead Stadium, and Confederate President Jefferson Davis for the National Guard Headquarters in Washington, D.C.

Ettl was married twice. Her first husband, Leland Speed, whom she married in 1931, served as the mayor of Jackson from 1945 to 1949. One of their children, Lake, became a stock car racing driver. After Leland's death in 1971, she married Alex John Ettl, and she resided in Princeton, New Jersey from 1972 to 1992. She died of cancer on January 10, 1993, in Jackson, Mississippi, and she was buried in Lakewood Memorial Park.

References

1911 births
1993 deaths
People from Monticello, Mississippi
Artists from Jackson, Mississippi
People from Princeton, New Jersey
American women sculptors
Sculptors from Mississippi
Deaths from cancer in Mississippi
20th-century American sculptors
20th-century American women artists